Calafindești  is a commune located in Suceava County, Romania. It is composed of two villages, Botoșanița Mare and Calafindești.

The closest cities are Siret (12 km), Rădăuți (15 km), and Suceava (25 km).

References

Communes in Suceava County
Localities in Southern Bukovina